Athletic Club of BC were a now dissolved Canadian soccer team based in Burnaby, British Columbia, Canada.

History

The club was founded in 2009, the team played in the Pacific Coast Soccer League (PCSL), a national amateur league at the fourth tier of the American Soccer Pyramid, which features teams from western Canada and the Pacific Northwest region of the United States of America. During the winter the club competed in the Premier division of the Fraser Valley Soccer League.

The team played its home matches at the Burnaby Lake Athletic Complex West, where they have played since 2009. The team's colours were blue, yellow and white.

On July 7, 2010, the PCSL announced that it has suspended the Athletic Club of BC.

Year-by-year

Honours

Competition history
2009 BC Men's Provincial Open Cup: lost in quarter-finals

Stadium
Burnaby Lake Athletic Complex West; Burnaby, British Columbia (2009–2010)

References

2009 establishments in British Columbia
Pacific Coast Soccer League teams
Soccer clubs in British Columbia
Sport in Burnaby
Association football clubs established in 2009